Currow is a rural village in County Kerry in south west Ireland, located approximately 12 km from Killarney and 18 km from Tralee. Currow is situated on the Brown Flesk River, a tributary of the River Maine.

Geography
Currow lies in the Electoral Division of Killeentierna. Killeentierna Electoral Division covers 3,375 hectares, much of which is arable land, mainly used as pasture for dairy stock. There are also areas of peat land, particularly to the south, where a blanket bog is located on the border with Kilcummin. Currow is mainly a residential area with close links to Castleisland. The main industry is agriculture. Currow is bordered to the west by Farranfore, to the south by Kilcummin, to the east by Scartaglin and to the north by Castleisland. Currans lies north west of Currow, which forms the Killeentierna Parish.

History
The original village grew up on both sides of the roadway to the north of Flesk Bridge, between two old estates, Dicksgrove and Parkmore, which have influenced the architectural character. The Meredith Family were the landlords of the area, residing in the old Parkmore estate. The first influence of the British came from the Herbert Family during the plantations. The village escaped much of the major development experienced by many nearby villages and towns during the Celtic Tiger. Any development is mainly one-off housing. 

Con Houlihan, a columnist with the Sunday World, once wrote how he considered Currow as his 'own favourite' village in Ireland. Although he is undecided whether Currow is a village or a hamlet. He also declared he would someday 'apply to be made a Freeman of Currow'.

Demographics 

Currow is in the Electoral District of Killeentierna. Historically a Gaeltacht area, it is within the Rural District of Killarney and is included in the Kerry constituency for national elections. Killeentierna is also the Roman Catholic Parish under the Roman Catholic Diocese of Kerry which is made up of Currow, Kilsarcon and Currans. Before 1898, Currow was included under the barony of Trughanacmy. However this form of administrative area has been obsolete since the Local Government Act 1898.

As of the 2006 Census, Killeentierna Electoral Division had a population of 892 persons (465 males and 427 females). This was a slight increase on 2002 Census figures of 856. The Census 1996 recorded 878 inhabitants. Catholicism was recorded as the largest religion in the area covering 95% of the population. Although the Irish language is not commonly spoken in the area, 395 people said in the Census 2006 that they had the ability to speak it.

The Census of Ireland 2011, which took place on 10 April, showed an increase in population in the Killeentierna Electoral District on Census 2006 figures, a 2.4% increase. The 2011 population was recorded as 913 persons, 461 males and 452 females.

Facilities 
Currow is typical of other Irish villages, consisting of basic facilities. The inhabitants travel to the primary district town of Castleisland for other services or to Tralee or Killarney for more specific services and facilities. Currow has one public house, a Roman Catholic church, community centre (consisting of large hall area, stage, meeting rooms, changing facilities), primary school, one convenience shop, graveyard, an electronic services workshop, beautician, small public park and a GAA pitch. There are several other small enterprises and services in the area. There previously was a post office and second public house, however both of these closed down in 2018.

Transport

Road 
Currow is located approximately 7 km from Castleisland, south of the N23 national primary road, which runs from Castleisland to Farranfore, connecting traffic from the N21 road to the N22 road. Currow Village is connected to both the N22 at Farranfore and the N23 at Lisheenbaun Cross via the R561 regional road. It is located on the old Killarney road, which is now considered a 'scenic route' to Killarney.

Bus services, provided by Bus Éireann, are limited to the village. Nearby stops are found in Farranfore and Castleisland.

Rail 
The closest railway station is found at Farranfore which is 3.5 km east of Currow. Irish Rail has several inter-city daily services to Dublin, Cork, Tralee and Killarney from Farranfore railway station. Connecting services to other cities can be accessed along this network.

Air 
Kerry Airport is also located at Farranfore on the N23. The runway is only 800m from Currow Village. However the terminal is 5 km in distance by road.

Media

Print publications 
Local notes are included in the pages of the Sliabh Luachra Outlook which is published every Saturday. This contains news from all areas of the Sliabh Luachra region. Local notes are also included in the weekly Kerryman newspaper, most often in the South County Edition. It is published on Wednesday.

In the 1990s, an annual newsletter ran to print, called Currow and Currans Anois is Aris which translates as 'now and then'. The editor was Con Dennehy, who later became the editor for the Sliabh Luachra Outlook. It included the news and reports from the particular year. It has ceased press for several years.

Radio and television 
Currow falls within the broadcast area of Radio Kerry. There is no regional television broadcaster specific to Currow or Kerry however a documentary was made on Currow in 2000. This documentary focused on Currow's sporting heritage and the four international rugby players who hail from the area. As well as interviews with local residents, the documentary shows footage from around the village.

Townlands 
The names of Currow's townlands reflect the local history and landscape. Although originally mainly of Irish language origin, many place names Anglicised over time. Local townlands include:

A - B
Annagh: Watery place // Boherbee: The yellow road // Beenateevane: The top of a sloping hill // Balygree: A town in the east of Dysert // Ballybeg: A small town // Bawnaglanna: Head land near a glen // Ballahantourigh: Assembly hill // Blackbriar: Conspicuous and elevated place // Barnfield: The field of the white marsh or hill // Ballymacdonnel: Town of MacDonnell // Ballindrohid: Townland at the bridge

C - D
Clashganniv: Hollow of the sand // Currow Ross: The little wood at the rounded hill // Currow City: // Clounclough: The meadow of the limestone // Clouncurrig: Pasture land, between two woods // Cloonacrrrig: The marshy place // Corraknockaun: Generally a marsh // Dysert: A desert or hermitage // Dicksgrove: Dick Meredith's grove // Tír na gCuas : Country of the caves // Dromulton: The ridge of the weathers // Droumrue: Red ridge

E - H
Farran: Land, field, territory country // Farrandoctor: A dear profitless spot of land Áitin daor docht // Farranmanach: The strangers plot // Farrankeal: A narrow stream // Glounlea: The grey glen // Gortalea: The field at the side of the hill // Glounbawn: The white glen // Gortacnach: The field of the hill // Garraundarragh: The grove of the oak trees // Gloundaeigh: Ravens glen The glen of the two ravens // Gortshanafa: The field of the old hut

I - O
Inchabee: Yellow inch // Inchincummer: Ravine valley The inch at the valley // Kilcow: Cuckoo wood // Killeentierna: The church of Tighernagh // Kilfeilim: The church of Feidhlim // Kilfalney: The church of the robe // Knockacorrin: The heap of the stones // Kilsarcon: The church of Arcain // Kileen: The little church // Laharn: Half land Townland near Farran // Lisheenbawn: Little white lios or fort // Lissataggle: The fort of the rye // Loughnagore: Loch na gCór ; Loch : A Lake Corr: Bird of the crane or heron kind // Lyre: Harp // Meanus: Mine

P - Z
Parknamulloge:The field of the skulls, lumpy Place, small height // Powell's Road: // Parknasmuttane: The field of the block or scraps of wood // Parkmore: The big field // Rossanean: The home by the birds // Ranaleen: Fort by the pool, pond or lake // Ranalough: The fort of the lake // Sandville: // Shanavullen: The old mill // Slieveenagh: // Springmount: Cnocearagh // Threegeeves: The amount of land a man could plough in a day // Urroghal: Cockle weed land

Community and culture 
Currow is served by several sporting organisations. The village's most dominant club is Currow GAA, which has its own grounds to the east of the village. It is also home to St. Bridget's Basketball Club, Community Games, Currow Cycling Club and Currow Gun Club. Many of these are based in the community centre. Most clubs support the colours set by the GAA of black and amber.

Currow has a Tidy Towns Organisation as well as a Rural Development group, focused on enhancing the local environment and developing amenities. Currow also has groups attached to the Roman Catholic Church which is in the Killeentierna Parish under the Diocese of Kerry. There is also a parish youth organisation; Killeentierna Youth Club.

The village is located in a cultural area known as Sliabh Luachra. This area is known for its style of traditional Irish music.

Places of interest

Currow Wildlife Park 
A pond and wildlife sanctuary has been created to the east of the village. Much work was carried out here by local development groups and work included the raising of water levels and landscaping. The area is now home to several species such as the moorhen, mute swan and mallard. A walk and seating area is also provided.

Church of the Immaculate Conception 
The Church of the Immaculate Conception is located at the centre of the village on a site donated by Mr. Richard Meredith, who had connections to the estate house in Dickgrove. This Roman Catholic church was built in 1957 to designs by Patrick J. Sheahan. The church was blessed and dedicated by Rev. Denis Moynihan, Bishop of Kerry, on 2 June 1954.

Scoil Mhuire Agus Naomh Threasa 
Scoil Mhuire Agus Naomh Threasa (English: St Mary's and Teresa School) is the primary school serving the parish of Currow. Originally Scoil Mhuire, the Department of Education amalgamated Scoil Mhuire with Kilsarcon School which centralized resources to the more modern facility in Currow Village.

Brown Flesk River 
Currow is situated on the Brown Flesk River (An Fhleisc Rua), a tributary of the River Maine. This river is designated a salmonid river under the EU Freshwater Fish Directive and is a productive angling river with high quality spawning and nursery grounds. This designation aims to protect and improve the quality of fresh waters that support certain species of fish.

Meredith Estate 
The Herberts were the first British family to settle in Currow during the plantations. The Merediths came to Currow in 1635 and bought some of the Herbert Estate. They were originally silversmiths. They built a stately home close to the village, now named after Richard Meredith, Dicksgrove, much of which still remains today, particularly the main house, gate lodges, and the estate walls which now run along a section of the R561. The Meredith mansion was burned out in 1932. In 1935 the Land Commission took over the estate lands. Currow GAA grounds are now located on the estate grounds.

Metal Bridge 
Built in the early 1930s by Con Singleton from Gneeveguilla in the townland of Ballybeg, located east towards Kilsarcon. The Metal Bridge is a crossing point along the Brown Flesk River. All work was done by pick and shovel and the bridge was made from concrete on dry land. A new channel was then dug out which diverted the waters. The name 'The Metal Bridge' is a slight digression, which actually comes from the previous footbridge that existed. That was built by metal and iron during the famine years. Any bigger traffic had to cross the water near the ford where it was shallow. The road on which it exists is also called Bóthar na Míne or Road of Meal. This is because the men who built it were paid in meal rather than money. There was a great flood in 1941, which swept one of the arches away. It has since been restored.

Reidy Bridge 
Reidy Bridge is located in the village, beside Dicksgrove Gate Lodge. It was named after the parish priest who served in Currow at the time of construction in 1941. It was a replacement for the bridge that swept away in the 1941 flood. It has three arches, replicating the old bridge. The river only flows through two of the arches. The third is for times of flood.

People 
 Moss Keane – International rugby player
 Mick Galwey - International rugby player
 Mick Doyle – International rugby player
 Séamus Scanlon – Inter-county footballer
 JJ Hanrahan – International rugby player

References

External links 
 Currow G.A.A. Club (archived)
 Currow Youth Club
 Currow Cycling Club

Towns and villages in County Kerry